JSC "2nd Arkhangelsk United Aviation Division" is an airline based in Arkhangelsk, Russia. It operates regional passenger and cargo services, as well as overseas humanitarian and peace-keeping work. Its main base is Vaskovo Airport, Arkhangelsk.

Fleet

The 2nd Arkhangelsk Aviation Enterprise fleet includes the following aircraft:

See also
 Arkhangelsk Airlines
 Arkhangelsk Airport

References

External links
Site at official Port of Arkhangelsk Site

Airlines of Russia
Companies based in Arkhangelsk
Former Aeroflot divisions
Aviation in Arkhangelsk Oblast
Airlines established in 1935
1935 establishments in the Soviet Union